Bellarmino is both a surname and a given name. Notable people with the name include:

 Robert Bellarmine (1542–1621), Saint and Cardinal of the Roman Catholic Church
 Bellarmino Bagatti (1905–1990), Roman Catholic archaeologist and ordained priest

See also
 Bellarmine (disambiguation)